Weslye Saunders (born January 16, 1989) is an American football tight end who is currently a free agent. He was signed by the Pittsburgh Steelers as an undrafted free agent in 2011. He played college football at South Carolina.

Professional career

Pittsburgh Steelers
After signing as an undrafted free agent for the Steelers on July 25, 2011, Saunders made the 53-man roster as the team's third string tight-end on September 6.  He caught his first regular season pass for two yards in a 23–20 win against the Indianapolis Colts on September 25.  He scored his first touchdown in a two-yard pass reception in a 13–9 Sunday night win against the Kansas City Chiefs on November 27.

He was suspended for the first 4 games of the 2012 season for taking Adderall. He was released by the Pittsburgh Steelers on October 12, 2012. Saunders was suspended the first 8 games of the 2013 season for taking a not yet published drug.

Indianapolis Colts
Saunders was signed by the Colts on October 17, 2012.  He was then cut on July 25, 2013, following a suspension.  Saunders was re-signed by the Colts on October 29, 2013, after he served his 8-game suspension. Wesley was waived by the Colts on August 30, 2014. He re-signed with the team on November 18, 2014, but was waived again on December 2, 2014.

Birmingham Iron
Saunders was signed by the Birmingham Iron of the Alliance of American Football but was waived before the start of the 2019 regular season.  He was re-signed on February 14, 2019, but was waived again on February 25.  He was re-signed again on February 28, and waived again on March 19.

Career statistics

References

External links
 Pittsburgh Steelers bio
 South Carolina Gamecocks bio

1989 births
Living people
Sportspeople from Durham, North Carolina
Players of American football from North Carolina
American football tight ends
South Carolina Gamecocks football players
Pittsburgh Steelers players
Indianapolis Colts players
Birmingham Iron players